The Crimson Wing: Mystery of the Flamingos is a 2008 British-American nature documentary that explores the great gathering of lesser flamingos which occurs every year at Lake Natron in  Tanzania and along the salt lakes of the African Rift Valley. It was the first movie released under the then-new Disneynature film label. It premiered in France on 26 October 2008, with narration by Zabou Breitman. The film was released theatrically in the UK on 29 September 2009 and direct-to-video in the United States on 19 October 2010 with narration by Mariella Frostrup.

Plot
The movie documents the lives of the lesser flamingos on the isolated shores of Lake Natron in greater Alola, revealing the breeding and parenting habits of the species. After mating on an immense salt island, the flamingos breed their chicks, who learn to survive and grow up in an extreme and dangerous environment. In the course of their journeys, they encounter marabou storks who prey on many eggs and newly born chicks and a spotted hyena who takes no pity on the adult flamingos.

As the film progresses, it focuses on the life of one of the flamingo chicks. The young flamingo teaches herself the key habits of the species. She successfully grows up to become a large, pink feathered bird and survives when the group is attacked by the hyena. Her story shows the strength and determination for life the flamingos have. The film ends by emphasizing the importance of preserving Lake Natron from pollution and exploitation to ensure the survival of the lesser flamingos, as over 80% of birds found in nature were born here.

Release
At the launch of the Disneynature studio in April 2008, it was announced that the first new production from the new studio would be The Crimson Wing, which would begin international release throughout 2009. However, the first film to be released by Disneynature was the US market release of the BBC Worldwide and Greenlight Media film Earth on Earth Day 2009, making The Crimson Wing the second film to be released by Disneynature.

The world premiere of The Crimson Wing took place on 26 October 2008 at the closing ceremony of the CinémaScience Festival in Bordeaux, France. Starting on 25 September 2009, The Crimson Wing was released for a limited run in the United Kingdom exclusively through Cineworld cinemas.

The Crimson Wing was released on DVD and Blu-ray in the UK on 15 March 2010 and in France on 24 March 2010. In Italy the movie was released in TV on Sky Cinema 1 and 1 HD on 3 April 2010 with the title Il mistero dei fenicotteri rosa. It was then released on DTV in the US on 19 October 2010.

Soundtrack
The soundtrack to the film was composed and performed by the British jazz-electronic group The Cinematic Orchestra, who produced the soundtrack with Steve McLaughlin. Teese Gohl orchestrated the score, which was performed at Air Lyndhurst by The Cinematic Orchestra and the London Metropolitan Orchestra, conducted by Andy Brown. The music was mixed by McLaughlin and The Cinematic Orchestra at British Grove Studios and Northpole Studio. On 17 September 2009 the composition was performed live by The Cinematic Orchestra with the London Metropolitan Orchestra at Union Chapel, Islington in London. In the same year it won the award for best original score at the Jackson Hole Wildlife Film Festival in Wyoming, USA on 1 October..

The original recordings of "Arrival of the Birds" and "Transformation" from the soundtrack were used in the last scene of the film The Theory of Everything and in the short film Together Apart from the Cornetto Cupidity Series. In December 2012, the song "Arrival of the Birds" appeared in a commercial for the women's perfume Acqua di Gioia by Giorgio Armani.

The score was originally set to be composed and performed by British singer-songwriter, musician, and producer Imogen Heap, for which she traveled to Tanzania, along with Ward, Aeberhard  and crew, during the shooting of the film in 2006 and 2007. Unfortunately, due to conflicting timing with the delayed release of the film clashing with the recording of her new album at the time, the task passed on to The Cinematic Orchestra.

Mark Mancina, who previously written and composed an arrangement of "When You Wish Upon a Star" for the 2006 Disney logo with David Metzger as the co-arranger and orchestrator, composed the music for the Disneynature logo.

Reception

Critical reception
On the review aggregator website Rotten Tomatoes, 75% of 20 critics' reviews are positive, with an average rating of 6.50/10.

Accolades

References

Further reading

External links

 

Flamingos
2008 films
American documentary films
British documentary films
Disneynature films
Documentary films about nature
2008 documentary films
Films set in Tanzania
Documentary films about birds
Films shot in Tanzania
2000s English-language films
2000s American films
2000s British films
English-language documentary films